"Out with a Bang" is a song co-written and recorded by American country music artist David Lee Murphy.  It was released in November 1995 as the fifth and final single and title track from his album Out with a Bang.  The song peaked at number 13 on the U.S. country charts and peaked at number 5 on the Canadian country charts.  It was written by Murphy and Kim Tribble.

Critical reception
Larry Flick, of Billboard magazine reviewed the song favorably calling it an "uptempo ode to goodtimes." He goes on to say that Murphy has a "distinctive voice and unique phasing that never gets lost in the production."

Chart positions
"Out with a Bang" debuted at number 70 on the U.S. Billboard Hot Country Singles & Tracks for the week of November 25, 1995.

Year-end charts

References

1995 singles
1995 songs
David Lee Murphy songs
Songs written by David Lee Murphy
Song recordings produced by Tony Brown (record producer)
MCA Records singles
Songs written by Kim Tribble